SAP NetWeaver Visual Composer is SAP’s web-based software modelling tool. It enables business process specialists and developers to create business application components, without coding.

Visual Composer produces applications in a declarative form, enabling code-free execution mode for multiple runtime environments. It provides application lifecycle support by maintaining the connection between an application and its model throughout its lifecycle. Visual Composer is designed with an open architecture, which enables developers to extend its design-time environment and modelling language, as well as to integrate external data services.

The tool aims to increase productivity by reducing development effort time, and narrow the gap between application definition and implementation.

Starting with a blank canvas, the Visual Composer user, typically a business process specialist, draws the application in Visual Composer Storyboard (workspace), without writing code, to prototype, design and produce applications.

A typical workflow for creating, deploying and running an application using Visual Composer is:

Create a model
 Discover data services and add them to the model
 Select necessary UI elements and add them to the model
 Connect model elements to define the model logic and data flow

Edit the layout
 Arranging the UI elements and the controls of the application on forms and tables.

Deploy the model
 This step includes compilation, validation and deployment to a selected environment.

Run the application
 The application can run using different runtime environment (such as Adobe Flex and HTML). In 2014 a runtime environment was introduced that is utilizing HTML5 capabilities of SAPUI5.

See also
SAP AG
NetWeaver
Modelling language

References

External links
 SAP NetWeaver Visual Composer discussions, blogs, documents and videos on the SAP Community Network (SCN)
Create applications easily with Visual Composer tool

Web applications
Visual Composer
Specification languages
Workflow applications